San Salvador de Tábara Monastery is a monastery in the present-day town of Tábara in Spain. It was founded at the end of the 9th century after Alfonso III of Asturias's victory at the battle of Polvoraria.

Its 12th century tower survives. It is notable as the home of the scriptorium which produced the Tábara Beatus, Morgan Beatus and Gerona Beatus.

Sources
Carlos R. Lafora, Andanzas en torno al legado mozárabe, Ediciones Encuentro, Madrid, 1991, p. 105-107.

Buildings and structures in the Province of Zamora
Romanesque architecture
monasteries in Spain